Madden NFL '94 is an American football video game released for the Sega Genesis and Super NES in 1993. It is the first game in the Madden series with an official National Football League team license, as well as the first Madden game that allows players to play a full regular season (via a password system). However, the game is not licensed by the NFL Players Association, so all of the players are identified by number only (the game would get the Players' Association license in the next year's edition).

It is the first Madden game to use the "EA Sports – It's in the Game" audio tag. It also introduces the "Flip play", "Play-call mode", "Pass-catch mode" and "Bluff play" options to the series. This is the first Madden title to pause the action and rotate the screen during punts, kickoffs, and turnovers, rather than instantly reversing P.O.V. to the opposite side of the field, which could be disorienting to players. The field can also be rotated to view plays from any angle in instant replay.

This is also the first Madden game to have Super Bowl teams available for play without any special codes.

Due to an error, the entire rosters for the New York Giants and New York Jets are reversed. For example, the quarterback for the Jets is #11 (Phil Simms of the Giants) while the quarterback for the Giants is #7 (Boomer Esiason of the Jets). This error affects at least the copies for SNES available during the Christmas shopping season of 1993.

Certain versions of the game are labeled as "Limited First Round Editions".

Reception

The game was a bestseller in the US, and made number 15 in the UK.  IGN rated the game 75th on their "Top 100 SNES Games of All Time."  They also wrote that instead of playing generic players and teams like its predecessors, the developers had use of the NFL license that players can play official players and teams with enhanced gameplay. They concluded their review opining Madden NFL 94 is: "Arguably the best Madden released in the 16-bit era, and maybe the most retro-nostalgic installment in the entire series."

References

External links
 

1993 video games
EA Sports games
Electronic Arts games
High Score Productions games
Madden NFL
Multiplayer and single-player video games
Sega Genesis games
Super Nintendo Entertainment System games
Video games developed in the United States
Video games scored by Brian L. Schmidt